Jorge Enrique Serpa Perez (born March 16, 1942, in Cienfuegos, Cuba ) is the former bishop of the Roman Catholic Diocese of Pinar del Rio.

Life and ministry
When Serpa was a child his family moved to Havana. He studied en El Buen Pastor Seminary in Havana. In 1961, he went to study theology in Tournai, Belgium.

Serpa was ordained on July 14, 1968, in Belgium and assigned to the Archdiocese of Havana. From 1968 to 1999, the Cuban government would not allow him to return to Cuba and he was then translated to the Archdiocese of Bogotá in Colombia.  He was allowed to return to Cuba in 1999. From 2003 to 2007, he was the rector of San Carlos and San Ambrosio Seminary.

He was appointed by Pope Benedict XVI on December 13, 2006, to be Bishop of Pinar del Rio. He was consecrated on January 13, 2007, at the cathedral in Havana by Cardinal Jaime Lucas Ortega y Alamino, Archbishop of Havana, assisted by Cardinal Pedro Rubiano Sáenz, Archbishop of Bogotá, and by Bishop José Siro González Bacallo of Pinar del Río. He took possession of his diocese the following day, January 14, 2007.

References

External links

 Agenzia Fides article
 Granma article

1942 births
Living people
People from Cienfuegos
21st-century Roman Catholic bishops in Cuba
Roman Catholic bishops of Pinar del Río